Hervé Anselme Ndjana Onana (born 1 June 1986) is a Cameroonian footballer who plays as a striker for Belgian club FC Mariekerke.

Career 
Onana began his career with Foudre d’Akonolinga and moved in summer 2007 to Red Star Waasland. In his second season at the club, he became top goalscorer of the Belgian Second Division with 26 goals.  He left the club on 17 June 2009, to sign for Belgian Pro League club Sint-Truiden. After two seasons with Sint-Truiden, he was loaned out twice, first to Enosis Neon Paralimni in Cyprus and then to Waasland-Beveren in Belgium, the successor team of Red Star Waasland. At Waasland-Beveren, he was part of the team that managed promotion to the Belgian Pro League during the 2011–12 season. However that same season Sint-Truiden made the opposite move as the team relegated to the Belgian Second Division and as he result, upon return from Waasland-Beveren he was allowed to leave. Onana then signed for Tubize. There, he became league top goalscorer of the Belgian Second Division in his first season with 17 goals; his second top scorer title of the division. but was unable to repeat his strong performances in the following season. Onana subsequently played for Sint-Eloois-Winkel Sport, Union Saint-Gillouse, La Louvière Centre, KSV Bornem and FC Mariekerke.

International career 
Onana's first call up for the Cameroon national football team was on 15 February 2009 for a trial camp in Paris.

References

External links 
 Footgoal Profile

1986 births
Living people
Cameroonian footballers
Cameroonian expatriate footballers
Cameroonian expatriate sportspeople in Belgium
Expatriate footballers in Belgium
Expatriate footballers in Cyprus
Association football forwards
Sint-Truidense V.V. players
Enosis Neon Paralimni FC players
Belgian Pro League players
Challenger Pro League players
S.K. Beveren players
A.F.C. Tubize players
Footballers from Yaoundé
Royale Union Saint-Gilloise players
UR La Louvière Centre players
Sint-Eloois-Winkel Sport players